Victor Arbez (17 May 1934 – 22 January 2016) was a French skier. He competed at the 1956, 1960, 1964 and the 1968 Winter Olympics.

References

External links
 

1934 births
2016 deaths
French male biathletes
French male cross-country skiers
Olympic biathletes of France
Olympic cross-country skiers of France
Biathletes at the 1960 Winter Olympics
Cross-country skiers at the 1956 Winter Olympics
Cross-country skiers at the 1960 Winter Olympics
Cross-country skiers at the 1964 Winter Olympics
Cross-country skiers at the 1968 Winter Olympics
Sportspeople from Jura (department)
20th-century French people
21st-century French people